Sinaoros or Sina Oros is a village in the Nicosia District of Cyprus, located 3 km north of Kakopetria.

References

Communities in Nicosia District